José Daniel Díaz Robertti (born February 22, 1989, in Acarigua, Portuguesa) is an amateur Venezuelan freestyle wrestler, who competed in the men's light heavyweight category before moving up to the heavyweight category. He won a bronze medal in the light heavyweight division at the 2011 Pan American Games in Guadalajara, Mexico.

Diaz represented Venezuela at the 2012 Summer Olympics in London, where he competed in the men's 84 kg class. He received a bye for the preliminary round of sixteen match, before losing out to Latvia's Armands Zvirbulis, with a three-set technical score (1–0, 0–1, 0–1), and a classification point score of 1–3.

At the 2016 Olympics, he competed in the men's heavyweight category.  There, he lost in the second round to Mamed Ibragimov.

References

External links
 NBC Olympics Profile
 

1989 births
Living people
Olympic wrestlers of Venezuela
Wrestlers at the 2012 Summer Olympics
Wrestlers at the 2011 Pan American Games
Pan American Games bronze medalists for Venezuela
People from Acarigua
Venezuelan male sport wrestlers
Pan American Games medalists in wrestling
Wrestlers at the 2015 Pan American Games
South American Games gold medalists for Venezuela
South American Games medalists in wrestling
Competitors at the 2018 South American Games
Wrestlers at the 2019 Pan American Games
Medalists at the 2015 Pan American Games
Medalists at the 2019 Pan American Games
Medalists at the 2011 Pan American Games
Pan American Wrestling Championships medalists
20th-century Venezuelan people
21st-century Venezuelan people